MV Altavia was a Liberian-flagged cargo ship launched on 24 September 1994 and completed on 4 April 1995. On July 20, 2010, Altavia was turned away from the Port of Hagåtña, Guam by United States Customs officials after thousands of spiders erupted from her cargo during unloading. In November 2014, she was sold for scrap.

References

External links

https://www.youtube.com/watch?v=a4cVGWTzKo8

1994 ships
Cargo ships of Liberia